The 1978 Japan Series was the 29th edition of Nippon Professional Baseball's postseason championship series. It matched the Central League champion Yakult Swallows against the Pacific League champion Hankyu Braves. The Braves entered the series looking to win their fourth consecutive title, while the Swallows were making their first-ever Japan Series appearance. The Swallows defeated the Braves in seven games to claim their first championship.

Summary

See also
1978 World Series

References

Japan Series
Orix Buffaloes
Tokyo Yakult Swallows
Japan Series
Japan Series
Japan Series
Japan Series